Soraya Vieira Telles-Teixeira (born September 6, 1958) is a former middle distance runner from Brazil, who represented her native country at the 1988 Summer Olympics in Seoul, South Korea.

She notably won a bronze medal in 800 metres at the 1987 Pan American Games, behind Ana Fidelia Quirot and Delisa Floyd.

References

1958 births
Living people
Brazilian female middle-distance runners
Athletes (track and field) at the 1988 Summer Olympics
Olympic athletes of Brazil
Athletes (track and field) at the 1979 Pan American Games
Athletes (track and field) at the 1987 Pan American Games
Athletes (track and field) at the 1991 Pan American Games
Place of birth missing (living people)
Pan American Games medalists in athletics (track and field)
Pan American Games bronze medalists for Brazil
Medalists at the 1987 Pan American Games